In physical chemistry, the McConnell equation gives the probability of an unpaired electron in an in aromatic radical compound (such as benzene radical anion ) being on a particular atom. It relates this probability, known as the "spin density", to its proportional dependence on the hyperfine splitting constant. 

The equation is

History 
The equation is named after Harden M. McConnell of Stanford University, who first presented it in 1956 in an article in the Journal of Chemical Physics.

References 
Peter Atkins, Julio de Paula, Atkins' Physical Chemistry, 9th ed., Oxford University Press, Oxford, 14, 556

Chemical physics